Sengdao Inthilath (born 3 June 1994) is a Laotian professional footballer who plays as a defender for Yotha FC in the Lao League. He made his national team debut on 20 May 2014.

External links 
 
 

1994 births
Living people
Laotian footballers
Laos international footballers
Yotha F.C. players
Association football defenders
Footballers at the 2014 Asian Games
Asian Games competitors for Laos